Vinyl banners are a form of outdoor advertising. Most banners are now digitally printed on large format inkjet printers which are capable of printing a full color outdoor billboard on a single piece of material.

Materials
The most commonly used material is a heavy weight vinyl technically known as PVC. The weights of the different banner substrates range from as light as 9 ounces to as heavy as 22 ounces per square yard (900gsm), and may be double- or single-sided. Grommets (eyelets) can also be added in order to facilitate hanging of the banner. A high frequency weld, stitching or banner hem tape are also used to fasten the hems neatly, and provide the insertion of grommets / eyelets. Large banners (which can be so large that they cover the side of a building) are usually printed on a special mesh pvc material so that some wind can pass through them.

Printing
There are various types of vinyl banner. Its useful life ranges from 3–5 years.

 Digitally printed banners: printed with aqueous (water-based), eco-solvent, solvent-based inks or UV-curable inkjet inks. The latter three types tend to contain durable pigments, which provide superior weather and UV-fading resistance. Large format inkjet printers are usually used, usually manufactured by companies such as HP, EFi Vutek, Mimaki, Roland, Mutoh, or one of many Chinese or Korean manufacturers. Very large banners may be produced using "grand format inkjet printers" of >2.5m width, or computer-controlled airbrush devices which print the ink directly onto the banner material.
 Vinyl lettered banners: produced by applying individual elements cut from self-adhesive vinyl by a computer-driven vinyl cutter. This method is now uncommon with the advent of large format printing.
 Screenprinted: produced using screenprinting, in which different colors are laid down one at a time using screens comprising an imaged stencil, through which the screen printing ink passes.  Screen printing may be done on hand benches, single / dual colour machines, or on high-performance multi-colour screen presses which can print at about 1,000 m2 per hour plus. Screenprinting is usually reserved for large quantities of the same banner due to cost-effectiveness but is closely matched and even surpassed by digitally printed banners.
 Painted: hand-painted graphics and lettering. These type of banners are uncommon with the advent of modern printing.

Finishing

 Hems: the most common form of finishing for vinyl banners. Hems allow for the more secure insertion of grommets or eyelets which allow the banner to be fixed or hung.
 Eyelets: (or grommets) are small (typically 12.5mm diameter inner) metal rings secured into the banner hem which allow rope, clips or bungee cord to be attached to the banner to aid fixing.
 Pole Pockets: vinyl banners can be finished with pole pockets, usually at the top and/or bottom where a loop is made from the same continuous material and fixed to the back of the banner by a high frequency weld, stitching or banner hem tape. This is common on scaffold banners where a scaffold pole is slid though to secure the banner on site. Hung banners can have a pole pocket at the bottom to hold a weighted bar which can add tension to the display and prevent it from billowing up.

Applications
Vinyl banners have many uses and applications. They are most often used to promote a company's logo, a special promotion, event, team or school. Since vinyl is a very flexible as well as portable material you can see vinyl banners just about anywhere. Vinyl banners are commonly seen as billboards, table banners, trade show banners, building banners, street banners, festival banners, as well as stadium flags.

A quality vinyl banner will also use an outside hem to ensure that Grommets are secured properly. Grommets are the nickel holes that enable the banner to be hung on fence posts, walls, or on the side of buildings. In windy conditions, if Grommets are not fastened into the hem of a vinyl banner, these grommet holes will easily tear out of the banner. Banner hem tapes are also used as decorative trim and to prevent delamination and lifting of vinyl hems.

References

Signage
Vinyl polymers